= La Machi Communication for Good Causes =

Argentinean-Spanish communication agency

La Machi
- La Machi Communication for Good Causes
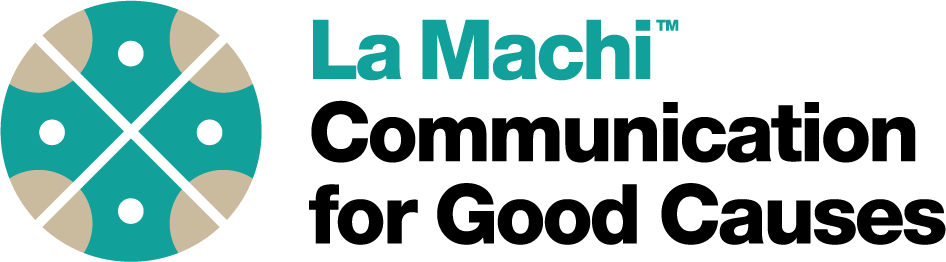
- Formation: 2012
- Type: Communication agency
- Location: Barcelona, Rome, Buenos Aires
- Website: www.lamachi.com

La Machi Communication for Good Causes is an Argentine-Spanish communication agency created in 2012, specializing in human rights, civic culture, religious values and ecology. It has offices in Barcelona, Buenos Aires and Rome. The agency has produced The Pope Video monthly since 2015, and produced the Click to pray app, used by people from 203 countries.

The agency was selected as Best International Marketing SME by the Argentine Marketing Association in 2015 and 2016, Bravo in 2017, and in 2018 it was selected as Best Social Agency in Spain, according to the FICE Ranking.
